An octopus is a sea animal with eight limbs.

Octopus may also refer to:

Film and television
 Octopus (2000 film), an American film produced by Nu Image
 Is Your Daughter Safe? or The Octopus, a 1927 film
 La piovra or The Octopus, a 1984–2001 Italian television series
 The Octopus, a fictional pair of Siamese twins in The City of Lost Children
 Octopus, a character in the 2002 Disney animated film Return to Never Land

Games
 OCTOPUS (fictional organisation), a fictional organisation in the From Russia with Love video game
 Name This Game or Octopus, an Atari 2600 video game
 Octopus, a 1981 Game & Watch game
 Octopus, a variant of British bulldogs, a playground game
 In chess, a knight strongly placed in enemy territory; see glossary of chess

Literature
 The Octopus: A Story of California, a 1901 novel by Frank Norris
 The Octopus (comics), a character in The Spirit
The Octopus, a title used for one issue in 1939 by the pulp magazine The Western Raider
 The Octopus, a 1940 book by Elizabeth Dilling
 "The Octopus", a fictional article in Atlas Shrugged by Ayn Rand
 Octopus: Sam Israel, the Secret Market, and Wall Street's Wildest Con, a 2012 book by Guy Lawson

Music

Artists
 Octopus (Belgian band) (1973–1980)
 Octopus (English band), a 1969–1971 band featuring Paul Griggs and Nigel Griggs
 Octopus (Scottish band), a 1993–1997 Britpop band from Shotts, Lanarkshire
 The Octopus Project, a band from Texas
 Oktopus or Alap Momin, American musician, DJ, recording engineer

Albums
 Octopus (Gentle Giant album) (1972)
 Octopus (The Human League album) (1995)
 Octopus (The Bees album) (2007)
 The Octopus (album), a 2011 album by Amplifier
 Í Hakanum/Octopus or Octopus, a 1980 album by Mezzoforte
 Octopus: The Best of Syd Barrett (1992)
 Octopuss, a 1983 album by Cozy Powell
 Octopus (Kris Davis and Craig Taborn album) (2018)

Songs
 "Octopus" (Syd Barrett song) (1969)
 "Octopus" (Bloc Party song) (2012)
 "Octopus", a 1961 song by Billie Jean Horton
 "Octopus", an instrumental by Mezzoforte from Í Hakanum/Octopus
 "Octopus", a 1979 song by The Freshies

Computing and technology
 OCTOPUS (network), an early computer network at Lawrence Livermore National Laboratory
 Octopus (software), for quantum-mechanical calculations of molecules and solids

Enterprises and organizations
 Octopus card, a Hong Kong stored value smart card launched in 1997
 Octopus Cards Limited, the operator of Octopus card
 Octopus Holdings Limited, holding company jointly owned by five major transport companies in Hong Kong
Octopus Group, a British asset management company
Octopus Energy, a British energy supply company
Octopus Publishing Group, a British subsidiary of Lagardère Publishing, specialising in illustrated books
 Organisation for Counter Terrorist Operations (OCTOPUS), a counter terrorism paramilitary unit in Andhra Pradesh & Telangana, India

Other uses
 Octopus (genus), a large genus of octopuses
 Octopus (ride), an amusement ride
 Octopus (yacht)
 Octopus, a spare scuba-diving regulator apparatus
 The Octopus, a news story written by Danny Casolaro

See also
 Al the Octopus, mascot of the Detroit Red Wings
 Doctor Octopus, a character created in 1963 for Spider-Man comics
 Octopodidae, a family containing the majority of known octopus species
 Octopodoidea, a superfamily of all known octopods except for the argonautoids and vampyromorphs
 Octopus as food
 Octopussy (disambiguation)
 Legend of the Octopus, a Detroit team tradition
 Paul the Octopus, octopus with a history of correctly predicting the results of major German international football matches